Silver Cloud is a small cruise ship operated by Silversea Cruises, the luxury brand of the Royal Caribbean Group conglomerate of cruise lines.  She entered service in 1994 as Silversea's first ship. Her sister ship is the Silver Wind, launched in 1995.

Silver Cloud formerly sailed on European itineraries (both the North Sea and the Mediterranean) in summer. In winter, she cruised in the Caribbean and South America. Since the ship was ice strengthened in 2017, itineraries have concentrated on polar regions, with visits to less common cruise destinations on transfers between the arctic and antarctic.

History 

As of 2008 the ship cruises the Baltic Sea, the North Sea, the Atlantic Ocean with stops at the Bahamas and in the Caribbean Sea, as well as journeys to the Atlantic coast of South America. Some cruises take it through the Mediterranean Sea. It also passes the Suez Canal with cruises through the Red Sea to the Persian Gulf calling at ports along the route that normal tourists seldom visit, such as Jeddah in Saudi Arabia.

The Silver Cloud has been home to both the United States men's and women's national basketball teams during the 2016 Summer Olympics in Rio, Brazil.

In 2017, the ship underwent a comprehensive rebuild to bring it up to ice class and it has since sailed on expedition cruises, including polar regions.

References

Notes

Bibliography

External links

Silversea: Silver Cloud – Silversea official site page about the ship

Silver Cloud
1993 ships